Smithtown is a hamlet and census-designated place (CDP) within the Town of Smithtown in Suffolk County, New York. The population was 26,470 at the 2010 census. The hamlet includes the former Village of The Landing, which was dissolved in 1939.

Geography
Smithtown is located at  (40.855794, -73.214607).

Demographics

As of the census of 2000, there were 26,901 people, 8,815 households, and 7,245 families residing in the CDP. The population density was 2,265.7 per square mile (875.0/km2). There were 8,956 housing units at an average density of 291.3 inhabitants/km2 (754.3 inhabitants/mi2). The racial makeup of the CDP was 96.35% White, 0.61% African American, 0.04% Native American, 1.77% Asian, 0.01% Pacific Islander, 0.53% from other races, and 0.69% from two or more races. Hispanic or Latino of any race were 3.38% of the population.

There were 8,815 households, out of which 38.3% had children under the age of 18 living with them, 72.2% were married couples living together, 7.3% had a female householder with no husband present, and 17.8% were non-families. 14.9% of all households were made up of individuals, and 7.6% had someone living alone who was 65 years of age or older. The average household size was 2.96 and the average family size was 3.29.

In the CDP, the population was spread out, with 26.1% under the age of 18, 5.0% from 18 to 24, 30.1% from 25 to 44, 24.3% from 45 to 64, and 14.6% who were 65 years of age or older. The median age was 39 years. For every 100 females, there were 93.1 males. For every 100 females age 18 and over, there were 90.2 males.

The median income for a household in the CDP was $81,272, and the median income for a family was $88,235. Males had a median income of $62,802 versus $38,315 for females. The per capita income for the CDP was $31,521.  About 2.0% of families and 3.1% of the population were below the poverty line, including 3.0% of those under the age of 18 and 4.4% ages 65 or older.

Media
Smithtown is the city of license for two radio stations, WFRS and WWSK, and the TV station WFTY-DT. The Times of Smithtown newspaper carries community-based articles.

See also
Smithtown (LIRR station)

References

Smithtown, New York
Census-designated places in New York (state)
Census-designated places in Suffolk County, New York